Kothamangalam is a Taluk headquarters and a municipality Ernakulam district in the state of Kerala in India. It is 15 kilometres from Muvattupuzha. Kothamangalam is a small town lying at the foothills of the Western Ghats and is known as The Gateway to the High Ranges. Until the recent past, the town was also a very important trading center for spices and hill produce. Present Kothamangalam region was historically known as Malakhachira. Kothamangalam is known for its old Christian churches and its prominent educational institutions. One of the first colleges in the region is the Mar Athanasius College of Arts and Science inaugurated in 1955 by the Emperor of Ethiopia, Haile Selassie I during his visit to Kerala.

(Managed by Mar Athanasius College Association)
Mar Athanasius College of Arts & Science 
Mar Athanasius College of Engineering 
Mar Athanasius International School

(Owned and managed by Mar Thoma Cheria Pally)
Mar Basil Higher Secondary School
Mar Baselios School of Nursing
Mar Baselios Dental College
Mar Baselios College of Nursing
Mar Baselios Institute of Technology & Science
 Malikdeenar Arts & Science College for Women Adivadu http://www.malikdeenar.org/college.htm
St. Marys Public School
Nangeliel Ayurveda Medical College
Yeldo Mar Baselios Arts & Science College 
St.Joseph's College of Nursing
Government Polytechnic College Kothamangalam
Greenvalley Public School
St. George Higher Secondary School
St. Augustin's Girls Higher Secondary School
Vimalagiri Public School
Shobana English Medium School
Indria Gandhi College of Arts & Science (NelliKuzhi)
Indira Gandhi College of Engineering for Women
Indira Gandhi Dental College
Indira Gandhi training college(B.Ed)
Indira Gandhi training institute(T.T.C)
Ilahia College of Engineering & Technology
St. Gregorios Dental College
Marian Institute of Management Studies
Bes Ania Public School
St. Stephens Higher Secondary School
St. Stephens Girls High School
T V Joseph Memorial Higher Secondary School
Government Technical High School Varappetty
Marian Academy of Management Studies Kothamangalam
Yeldo Mar Baselios College School of Media and Design

See also
technical high school, Varapetty.            
Jose College of Arts, Kothamangalam
Malikdeenar Arts & Science College for Women,Adivadu,Pallarimangalam P O
http://www.malikdeenar.org/college.htm

Hospitals

 Govt. Taluk Hospital
 Mar Baselios Medical Mission Hospital
 St. Josephs Medical Mission Hospital
 Nangelil Ayurvedic Medical College
 T V J Eye Hospital

References

Lists of universities and colleges in Kerala
Education in Ernakulam district
Kothamangalam